is a village located in Shiribeshi Subprefecture, Hokkaido, Japan.

, the village has an estimated population of 1,940. The total area is 119.92 km2.

Geography
Rusutsu is located on the southern of Shiribeshi Subprefecture. Mount Shiritsu is in the northern of the town.

The name came from Ainu word "Ru-sutu", meaning "Road at the foot of the mountain".

Neighboring municipalities
 Shiribeshi Subprefecture
 Kimobetsu
 Makkari
 Iburi Subprefecture
 Date
 Toyako

History
1897: Makkari Village split off from Abuta Village (now Toyako Town).
1901: Kaributo Village (now Niseko Town) was split off from Makkari Village.
1906: Makkari Village became a Second Class Village.
1910: Makkari Village was transferred from Muroran Subprefecture (now Iburi Subprefecture) to Shiribeshi Subprefecture.
1917: Kimobetsu Village (now town) was split off from Makkari Village.
1922: Makkaribetsu Village (now Makkari Village) was split off from Makkari Village.
1925: Makkari Village changed its name to Rusutsu Village.

Sister city
  Yabu, Hyogo, Japan

Industry
Rusutsu is the top producer of Daikon in Hokkaido. It also produces potato and Asparagus.

Commercial facilities and companies of Rusutsu are along Route 230. There are Sightseeing spots such as Rusutsu Resort at a distance from the center of the village.

Education
 High school
 Hokkaido Rusutsu High School
 Junior high school
 Rusutsu Junior High School
 Elementary school
 Rusutsu Elementary School

Notable people from Rusutsu
Kotonofuji Muneyoshi, former sumo wrestler

References

External links

Official Website 

Villages in Hokkaido